"This Town" is a song written by Lee Hazlewood and recorded by Frank Sinatra in 1967. The song was first seen on Sinatra's 1967 album The World We Knew.

Chart performance
It reached number 53 on the U.S. Billboard Hot 100 and number 17 on the Easy Listening chart.  "This Town" peaked at number 41 on Cash Box during the fall of that year.

Later uses
 "This Town" was included in Sinatra's 1968 Greatest Hits album.

Cover versions
 The Tubes covered the song on their 1977 album, Now.

Popular culture
 The song was featured in the 1967 television special, Movin' with Nancy, which starred Nancy Sinatra. A special version was released to home video in 2000.
 "This Town" was used in films such as The Cool Ones, Matchstick Men, Ocean's Thirteen, From Paris With Love, and The Bounty Hunter.
 "This Town" was also used as a partial sound clip in the 2016 The Simpsons episode "Trust but Clarify".

Notes

1967 singles
Frank Sinatra songs
Nancy Sinatra songs
2008 singles
1967 songs
Songs written by Lee Hazlewood
Song recordings produced by Bob Gaudio
Male–female vocal duets